Rent-seeking is the act of growing one's existing wealth by manipulating the social or political environment without creating new wealth.
Rent-seeking activities have negative effects on the rest of society. They result in reduced economic efficiency through misallocation of resources, reduced wealth creation, lost government revenue, heightened income inequality, risk of growing political bribery, and potential national decline.

Attempts at capture of regulatory agencies to gain a coercive monopoly can result in advantages for rent-seekers in a market while imposing disadvantages on their uncorrupt competitors. This is one of many possible forms of rent-seeking behavior.

Description

The term rent, in the narrow sense of economic rent, was coined by the British 19th-century economist David Ricardo, but rent-seeking only became the subject of durable interest among economists and political scientists more than a century later after the publication of two influential papers on the topic by Gordon Tullock in 1967, and Anne Krueger in 1974. The word "rent" does not refer specifically to payment on a lease but rather to Adam Smith's division of incomes into profit, wage, and rent.  The origin of the term refers to gaining control of land or other natural resources. 

Georgist economic theory describes rent-seeking in terms of land rent, where the value of land largely comes from the natural resources native to the land, as well as collectively paid for services, for example: State schools, law enforcement, fire prevention and mitigation services etc. Rent seeking to the Georgist does not include those persons that may have invested substantial capital improvements to a piece of land, but rather those that perform in their role as mere titleholder. This is the dividing line between a rent-seeker and a property developer, which need not be the same person.

Rent-seeking is an attempt to obtain economic rent (i.e., the portion of income paid to a factor of production in excess of what is needed to keep it employed in its current use) by manipulating the social or political environment in which economic activities occur, rather than by creating new wealth. Rent-seeking implies extraction of uncompensated value from others without making any contribution to productivity. Because the nature of rent-seeking implies a fixed cost payment, only wealthy participants engage in these activities as a means of protecting their wealth from expropriation.

In many market-driven economies, much of the competition for rents is legal, regardless of any harm it may do to an economy. However, various rent-seeking behaviors are illegal, such as the forming of cartels or the bribing of politicians.

Rent-seeking is distinguished in theory from profit-seeking, in which entities seek to extract value by engaging in mutually beneficial transactions. Profit-seeking in this sense is the creation of wealth, while rent-seeking is "profiteering" by using social institutions, such as the power of the state, to redistribute wealth among different groups without creating new wealth. In a practical context, income obtained through rent-seeking may contribute to profits in the standard, accounting sense of the word.

Tullock paradox
The Tullock paradox is the apparent paradox, described by economist Gordon Tullock, on the low costs of rent-seeking relative to the gains from rent-seeking.

The paradox is that rent-seekers wanting political favors can bribe politicians at a cost much lower than the value of the favor to the rent-seeker. For instance, a rent seeker who hopes to gain a billion dollars from a particular political policy may need to bribe politicians with merely ten million dollars, which is about 1% of the gain to the rent-seeker. Luigi Zingales frames it by asking, "Why is there so little money in politics?" because a naïve model of political bribery and/or campaign spending should result in beneficiaries of government subsidies being willing to spend an amount up to the value of the subsidies themselves, when in fact only a small fraction of that is spent.

Possible explanations
Several possible explanations have been offered for the Tullock paradox:

 Voters may punish politicians who take large bribes, or live lavish lifestyles. This makes it hard for politicians to demand large bribes from rent-seekers.
 Competition between different politicians eager to offer favors to rent-seekers may bid down the cost of rent-seeking.
 Lack of trust between the rent-seekers and the politicians, due to the inherently underhanded nature of the deal and the unavailability of both legal recourse and reputational incentives to enforce compliance, pushes down the price that politicians can demand for favors.
 Rent-seekers can use a small part of the benefit gained to make contributions to the politicians who provided enabling legislation.

Examples

The classic example of rent-seeking, according to Robert Shiller, is that of a property owner who installs a chain across a river that flows through his land and then hires a collector to charge passing boats a fee to lower the chain. There is nothing productive about the chain or the collector, neither passers get anything in return. The owner has made no improvements to the river and is not adding value in any way, directly or indirectly, except for himself. All he is doing is finding a way to obtain money from something that used to be free.

An example of rent-seeking in a modern economy is spending money on lobbying for government subsidies in order to be given wealth that has already been created, or to impose regulations on competitors, in order to increase market share. Another example of rent-seeking is the limiting of access to lucrative occupations, as by medieval guilds or modern state certifications and licensures. According to some libertarian perspectives, taxi licensing is a textbook example of rent-seeking. To the extent that the issuing of licenses constrains overall supply of taxi services (rather than ensuring competence or quality), forbidding competition from other vehicles for hire renders the (otherwise consensual) transaction of taxi service a forced transfer of part of the fee, from customers to taxi business proprietors.

The concept of rent-seeking would also apply to corruption of bureaucrats who solicit and extract "bribe" or "rent" for applying their legal but discretionary authority for awarding legitimate or illegitimate benefits to clients. For example, tax officials may take bribes for lessening the tax burden of the taxpayers.

Regulatory capture is a related term for the collusion between firms and the government agencies assigned to regulate them, which is seen as enabling extensive rent-seeking behavior, especially when the government agency must rely on the firms for knowledge about the market. Studies of rent-seeking focus on efforts to capture special monopoly privileges such as manipulating government regulation of free enterprise competition. The term monopoly privilege rent-seeking is an often-used label for this particular type of rent-seeking. Often-cited examples include a lobby that seeks economic regulations such as tariff protection, quotas, subsidies, or extension of copyright law. Anne Krueger concludes that "empirical evidence suggests that the value of rents associated with import licenses can be relatively large, and it has been shown that the welfare cost of quantitative restrictions equals that of their tariff equivalents plus the value of the rents".

Rent-seeking through government enterprise takes the form of seeking subsidies and avoiding tariffs. This seems like the actions of a firm looking for investment in productivity but in doing so creates an exclusionary effect for more productive firms.

Lotta Moberg presents an argument that export processing zones (EPZ) allow governments to choose exporting industries which receive tariffs allowing for rent seeking to take place. An example of this occurred in Latin America in the 1960s with Joaquín Balaguer's response to pressure from the United States to open the Dominican Republic's export market. At the time, the United States was a massive trading partner for sugar while providing foreign aid and military support which allowed Balaguer's regime to take hold. Joaquín Balaguer used EPZ to allow for some markets to remain tariffed while appeasing the markets facing political pressures. This created a sub-optimal environment for exporters as they were able to invest in rent seeking activities (lobbying) to gain access to EPZ to gain tax and tariff exemptions.

In some cases, rent-seeking can provide a net positive for an economy. Shannon K. Mitchell's article "The Welfare Effects of Rent-Saving and Rent-Seeking" provides such an example through a model of rent-seeking when firms need to expand to obtain their exporting rents.

Economists such as Lord Adair Turner, the former chair of the British Financial Services Authority, have argued that innovation in the financial industry is often a form of rent-seeking.

Development of theory
The phenomenon of rent-seeking in connection with monopolies was first formally identified in 1967 by Gordon Tullock.

A 2013 study by the World Bank showed that the incentives for policy-makers to engage in rent-provision is conditional on the institutional incentives they face, with elected officials in stable high-income democracies the least likely to indulge in such activities vis-à-vis entrenched bureaucrats and/or their counterparts in young and quasi-democracies.

Criticism
In the 1980s, critiques of rent-seeking theory began to emerge, questioning the ambiguity of the concept of "wasted resources" and the reliability of the assumptions being made from it. Samuels argues that productivity is defined by rent-seeking theorists as a strictly physical property but ignores the rights that surround and define the product. He further asserts that rent-seeking theorists ignore a fundamental principle of being economic actors: that we live in markets of scarce resources and it's how we utilise these resources which drives supply and demand, and the notion of "wasted resources" rejects our preferences to allocate those resources.

Writing in The Review of Austrian Economics, Ernest C. Pasour says that there may be difficulties distinguishing between beneficial profit-seeking and detrimental rent-seeking.

Possible consequences 
From a theoretical standpoint, the moral hazard of rent-seeking can be considerable. If "buying" a favorable regulatory environment seems cheaper than building more efficient production, a firm may choose the former option, reaping incomes entirely unrelated to any contribution to total wealth or well-being. This results in a sub-optimal allocation of resourcesmoney spent on lobbyists and counter-lobbyists rather than on research and development, on improved business practices, on employee training, or on additional capital goodswhich slows economic growth. Claims that a firm is rent-seeking therefore often accompany allegations of government corruption, or the undue influence of special interests.

Rent-seeking can prove costly to economic growth; high rent-seeking activity makes more rent-seeking attractive because of the natural and growing returns that one sees as a result of rent-seeking. Thus organizations value rent-seeking over productivity. In this case, there are very high levels of rent-seeking with very low levels of output. Rent-seeking may grow at the cost of economic growth because rent-seeking by the state can easily hurt innovation. Ultimately, public rent-seeking hurts the economy the most because innovation drives economic growth.

Government agents may initiate rent-seeking, as by soliciting bribes or other favors from the individuals or firms that stand to gain from having special economic privileges, which opens up the possibility of exploitation of the consumer. It has been shown that rent-seeking by bureaucracy can push up the cost of production of public goods. It has also been shown that rent-seeking by tax officials may cause loss in revenue to the public exchequer.

Mançur Olson traced the historic consequences of rent seeking in The Rise and Decline of Nations. As a country becomes increasingly dominated by organized interest groups, it loses economic vitality and falls into decline. Olson argued that countries that have a collapse of the political regime and the interest groups that have coalesced around it can radically improve productivity and increase national income because they start with a clean slate in the aftermath of the collapse. An example of this is Japan after World War Two. But new coalitions form over time, once again shackling society in order to redistribute wealth and income to themselves. However, social and technological changes have allowed new enterprises and groups to emerge.

A study by Laband and John Sophocleus in 1988 estimated that rent-seeking had decreased total income in the US by 45 percent. Both Dougan and Tullock affirm the difficulty of finding the cost of rent-seeking. Rent-seekers of government-provided benefits will in turn spend up to that amount of benefit in order to gain those benefits, in the absence of, for example, the collective-action constraints highlighted by Olson. Similarly, taxpayers lobby for loopholes and will spend the value of those loopholes, again, to obtain those loopholes (again absent collective-action constraints). The total of wastes from rent-seeking is then the total amount from the government-provided benefits and instances of tax avoidance (valuing benefits and avoided taxes at zero). Dougan says that the "total rent-seeking costs equal the sum of aggregate current income plus the net deficit of the public sector".

Mark Gradstein writes about rent-seeking in relation to public goods provision, and says that public goods are determined by rent seeking or lobbying activities. But the question is whether private provision with free-riding incentives or public provision with rent-seeking incentives is more inefficient in its allocation.

Political rent-seeking can also affect immigration. Welfare states incentivise unproductive migration and can create continuation of past behaviour of not accumulating personal wealth and being dependent on government transfers. Alternatively, productive migrants are incentivised to leave rent-seeking societies, possibly resulting in further economic decline. Low-income countries are often rent-seeking societies, that productive people will likely seek to leave.

The Nobel Memorial Prize-winning economist Joseph Stiglitz has argued that rent-seeking contributes significantly to income inequality in the United States through lobbying for government policies that let the wealthy and powerful get income, not as a reward for creating wealth, but by grabbing a larger share of the wealth that would otherwise have been produced without their effort. Thomas Piketty, Emmanuel Saez, and Stefanie Stantcheva have analyzed international economies and their changes in tax rates to conclude that much of income inequality is a result of rent-seeking among wealthy tax payers.

Laband and John Sophocleus suggest that the lack of empirical evidence on rent-seeking is due to the broad scope of rent-seeking and rent avoidance activities. Additionally, they suggest that many economic performance measures, such as Gross Domestic Product, include goods and services that are part of the rent-seeking process.

See also

References

Further reading

External links
 Rent-Seeking, The Economist
 
 Rent-Seeking as Process by Mushtaq Khan

Factors of production
Political corruption
Public choice theory

de:Politische Rente#Rent-Seeking